The Maqueda Channel is a strait in the Philippines, eastern side, separating the island of Catanduanes from the Caramoan Peninsula in the Bicol Region of Luzon. The strait connects Lagonoy Gulf and the Philippine Sea.

See also
 Maqueda Channel

References

Straits of the Philippines
Landforms of Camarines Sur
Landforms of Catanduanes